Malden is an unincorporated community in Morgan Township, Porter County, in the U.S. state of Indiana. The town is locally well known for its Labor Day parade, usually having a large turn-out despite the town's small size.

History
Malden was platted in 1909. The community was named after Malden, Massachusetts. Malden once contained a post office under the name Liberty View. This post office operated from 1910 until 1913.

Geography

Malden is a small unincorporated community with a bar, the Malden Oasis, and New Hope Missionary Church. Across the street is a grain elevator, the Co-op. In between the bar and the church lies a street which has houses on it. By that street there is a historical school house that is still visible from Highway Forty-Nine.

References

Unincorporated communities in Indiana
Unincorporated communities in Porter County, Indiana